Calvin Veltman (born 1941) is an American sociologist, demographer and sociolinguist at the Université du Québec à Montréal. He previously worked at the State University of New York at Plattsburgh. In the United States, his work on English use and acquisition among Hispanics is well known.

Publications

The United States 

 "Anglicization in the United States: the Importance of Parental Nativity and Language Practice", 1981 (International Journal of the Sociology of Language)
 "Anglicization in the United States: Language Environment and Language Practice of American Adolescents", 1983 (International Journal of the Sociology of Language)
 Language Shift in the United States, 1983 (Mouton-de Gruyter)
 L'avenir du français aux États-Unis, 1987 (Conseil de la langue française, Québec)
 The Future of the Spanish Language in the United States, 1988 (Hispanic Policy Development Project)
 "Modelling the Language Shift Process of Hispanic Immigrants", 1989 (International Migration Review)
 "The Status of the Spanish Language in the United States at the Beginning of the 21st Century", 1990 (International Migration Review)
 "The American Linguistic Mosaic: Understanding Languages Shift in the United States", 2000 (in McKay and Wong, eds)

Quebec (Canada) 

 Les Grecs du quartier Parc Extension, 1984 (Institut national de la recherche scientifique: urbanisation)
 L'intégration sociolinguistique des Québécois d'origine portugaise, 1985 (Institut national de la recherche scientifique: urbanisation)
 L'adaptation des immigrants de la décennie 1980, 1993 (Ministère des communautés culturelles et de l'immigration, Québec)
 "Using Field Methods to Assess the Validity of the Canadian Census", 1985 (in P. Nelde, ed.)
 "The English Language in Quebec, 1940-1990", 1995 (in Fishman, ed.)
 "The Interpretation of the Language Questions of the Canadian Census", 1985 (Canadian Review of Sociology and Anthropology)
 "Assessing the Impact of Quebec's Language Legislation", 1986 (Canadian Public Policy
 Concentration ethnique et usages linguistiques en milieu scolaire, 1999 (Immigration et métropoles)
 Veltman, Calvin, and Andrew Hund. "Confirming Good Theory with Bad Data : l'anglicisation des hispano-
américains." Demographie et Cultures. (https://web.archive.org/web/20070323183821/http://www-aidelf.ined.fr/colloques/ Quebec/aidelf-2008/IMG/pdf/VELTMANT.pdf). [In French] 2008.

Alsace (France) 

 Le déclin du dialecte alsacien, 1989 (Presses universitaires de Strasbourg)
 "La régression du dialecte", 1982 (Institut Nationale de la Statistique et des Études Économiques)
 "La transmission de l'alsacien dans le milieu familial", 1983 (Revue des sciences sociales de la France de l'Est)
 "L'usage de l'alsacien du milieu urbain", 1984 (Actes du IIe colloque internationale des démographes de langue française)
 "Assimilation linguistique des alsaciens: politiques officielles, évolution, tendances actuelles", 1987 (Éditions de l'ORSTOM)
 "Usages linguistiques en Alsace : présentation d'une enquête et premiers résultats", 1988 (International Journal of the Sociology of Language)

References

1941 births
Living people
American sociologists
Sociolinguists
State University of New York faculty
Academic staff of the Université du Québec à Montréal